Night of the Garter is a 1933 British comedy film directed by Jack Raymond and starring Sydney Howard, Winifred Shotter and Elsie Randolph.

The film was made at British and Dominion's Elstree Studios by the producer Herbert Wilcox for release by United Artists. It was based on the play Getting Gertie's Garter by Avery Hopwood and Wilson Collison. The film's sets were designed by the art director Andrew Mazzei.

Premise
A bridegroom searches for his bride's missing jewelled garter.

Cast
 Sydney Howard as Bodger
 Winifred Shotter as Gwen Darling
 Elsie Randolph as Jenny Warwick
 Connie Ediss as Fish
 Austin Melford as Bunny Phipps
 Harold French as Teddy Darling
 Jack Melford as Kenneth Warwick
 Marjorie Brooks as Barbara Phipps
 Arthur Chesney as Vicar

References

Bibliography
 Low, Rachael. Filmmaking in 1930s Britain. George Allen & Unwin, 1985.
 Wood, Linda. British Films, 1927-1939. British Film Institute, 1986.

External links

1933 films
1933 comedy films
1930s English-language films
Films directed by Jack Raymond
British comedy films
Films set in England
British films based on plays
British black-and-white films
British and Dominions Studios films
Films shot at Imperial Studios, Elstree
1930s British films